Faye McClelland (born 3 November 1979) is a British paratriathlete who competes in the PT4 category. , she is the 3rd-ranked women's PT4 athlete internationally. She finished fourth at the 2016 Summer Paralympics. Previously she won the ITU world title in her classification in 2010, 2011, 2012 and 2013, placing second in 2014. In 2016 Faye competed in the Paralympics in Rio, placing 4th.

McClelland was coached by the head coach of the GB paratriathlon squad, Jonathan Riall.

Career results
ETU European Triathlon Championships PT4
 2010 1st Place ETU European Triathlon Championship Athlone, Ireland
 2011 1st Place ETU European Triathlon Championship Pontevedra, Spain
 2012 1st Place ETU European Triathlon Championship Eilat, Israel
 2014 2nd Place ETU European Triathlon Championship Kitzbühel, Austria

ITU World Triathlon Championships PT4
 2010 1st Place ITU World Triathlon Championship Budapest, Hungary
 2011 1st Place ITU World Triathlon Championship Beijing, China
 2012 1st Place ITU World Aquathlon Championship Auckland, New Zealand
 2012 1st Place ITU World Triathlon Championship Auckland, New Zealand
 2013 1st Place ITU World Triathlon Championship London, Great Britain

ITU World Triathlon International Events PT4
 2010 1st Place ITU World Paratriathlon Event London, Great Britain
 2011 1st Place ITU World Paratriathlon Event London, Great Britain
 2014 1st Place ITU World Paratriathlon Event Yokohama, Japan
 2014 2nd Place ITU World Paratriathlon Event London, Great Britain

British Triathlon National Events PT4
 2014 1st Bexhill Lions Sprint Triathlon Bexhill, East Sussex

Awards and honours
 2012 Female Paratriathlete of the Year.British Triathlon Federation
 2013 Female Paratriathlete of the Year.British Triathlon Federation
 2013 Disabled Sports Personality of the Year. Sussex Sports Awards Brighton
 2014 Alumnus Award, for Outstanding Sporting Achievement.University of Brighton
 2014 Female Paratriathlete of the Year. 220 Magazine

Outside of triathlon
McClelland is a qualified physiotherapist and attained her honours at the University of Brighton in the summer of 2013. In January 2014, McClelland and Wes Mechen started a business, Tempo Running Shop, in Eastbourne East Sussex.

References

External links

 

Living people
1979 births
British disabled sportspeople
Paratriathletes of Great Britain
English female triathletes
Paratriathletes at the 2016 Summer Paralympics